Harry Gore Bishop (November 22, 1874 – August 31, 1934) was a United States Army artillery general and author. He is most noted for his service as a Chief of  Field Artillery branch of the Army between years 1930–1934.

Early life and education
Bishop was born November 22, 1874, in Grand Rapids, Michigan. Bishop attended the United States Military Academy at West Point, graduating with the class of 1897.

Career
In 1916, during the Mexican Revolution, Bishop served on the U.S.-Mexico border.  In 1917, attempting to fly as a passenger in an airplane from San Diego, California to Calexico, California, he was forced to land in Mexico and was lost for nine days before being recovered by a search party.

On the entry of the United States into World War I, Bishop was promoted to brigadier general. Serving in France, he commanded the 159th Field Artillery Brigade and later the 3rd Artillery Brigade. He received the Distinguished Service Medal and the French Légion d'honneur for his service.

Following the conclusion of the war, Bishop was made Chief of the Philippine Department. In 1925, he returned to the United States and commanded the 15th Field Artillery at Fort Sam Houston in Texas.  Other appointments included Chief of the Hawaiian Department. While stationed in Hawaii, he commanded the 8th Field Artillery at Schofield Barracks.

In 1930, Bishop was promoted to major general and made Chief of Artillery, subordinate only to the Chief of Staff of the United States Army, and relocated to Washington, D.C.

Family
Bishop's wife was Ella Van Horn Foulois, who had earlier divorced Maj. Gen. Benjamin Delahauf Foulois, Chief of the Army Air Corps.

Retirement and death
On August 31, 1934, after suffering for a year from painful colitis, Bishop was notified that he was being retired for disability, with the rank of major general. He returned to his residence on 16th Street in Washington, and shot himself in the head. He was buried at Arlington National Cemetery, in Arlington, Virginia.

Writings
As a young man, Bishop wrote several short stories, some of which would now be considered science fiction.  These were:
 On the Martian Way, November 1907 in The Broadway Magazine. This story is notable for being one of the earliest to feature an imagined future society in which space travel is commonplace. It was reprinted in Amazing Stories (February, 1927) and in Star Magazine (July, 1931).
 Congealing the Ice Trust, December 1907 in The New Broadway Magazine
 Mogul, January 1912 in Everybody's Magazine.

Later works were purely military in character:
 Elements of Modern Field Artillery – U.S. Service (1914, 2nd ed. 1917)
 Operation Orders, Field Artillery: A Study in the Technique of Battle Orders (1916)
 Field Artillery: The King of Battles (1935)

References

Bibliography

External links
 On the Martian Way
 

 

1874 births
1934 suicides
United States Army Field Artillery Branch personnel
People from Grand Rapids, Michigan
American science fiction writers
American short story writers
United States Army generals
American military personnel who committed suicide
Recipients of the Distinguished Service Medal (US Army)
Recipients of the Legion of Honour
Suicides by firearm in Washington, D.C.
Burials at Arlington National Cemetery
American male short story writers
American male novelists
United States Army generals of World War I
Military personnel from Michigan